Tenmile Creek is a stream in Washington and Greene Counties, Pennsylvania, USA. It is a tributary of the Monongahela River.

Name origin
Tenmile Creek was so named on account of frequent branches, occurring about every . The creek's name is sometimes spelled Ten Mile Creek or Ten-Mile Creek.

Tributaries 
The major tributary of Tenmile Creek is South Fork Tenmile Creek, which rises in western Greene County and flows generally east entering Tenmile Creek at Clarksville, Pennsylvania. The watershed is roughly 24% agricultural, 68% forested and the rest is other uses.

South Fork Tenmile Creek has a number of smaller tributaries, including Grimes Run on the left, which rises in central Greene County and flows southeast entering South Fork Tenmile Creek northeast of Morrisville, Pennsylvania. The watershed is roughly 15% agricultural, 74% forested and the rest is other uses.

See also
List of rivers of Pennsylvania

References

Tributaries of the Monongahela River
Rivers of Greene County, Pennsylvania
Rivers of Washington County, Pennsylvania
Rivers of Pennsylvania
Allegheny Plateau